The eighth series of You Can Dance - Po prostu Tańcz! premiered on TVN on 2 March 2015. Agustin Egurrola, Michał Piróg and Kinga Rusin all returned as judges and Patricia Kazadi presents the show once again.

The auditions began on 5 January 2015 in Wrocław.

Auditions
The auditions were held in five Polish cities throughout January 2015.  The first day was an open audition, when the producers would choose auditionees, who would then perform in front of the judges and live audience. The filmed audition with judges took place on the following day. Footage from these auditions will be shown in first five episodes.

Notes

  As the auditions in Kraków took more time than expected, some audition footage from Kraków was also featured in the episode broadcast on 16 March 2015.
  Michał Piróg funded an extra ticket to Sevilla for Kasia Pursa after her audition in Warsaw, resulting in 37 dancers taking part in choreography camp, instead of usual 36.

Top 37 dancers
During the auditions judges picked 37 dancers. These dancers were taking part in choreography camp in Sevilla.

Top 14 Contestants

Women

Men

Elimination chart

Performance shows

Week 1: Top 14 (20 April 2015)

Group Dance: "Living for Love" - Madonna (Commercial; Choreographer: Tomasz Prządka (season 3)
Top 14 Couple dances:

Solos:

Eliminated:
Monika Radziszewska
Patryk Brdej

Week 2: Top 12 (27 April 2015)

Group Dance: "G.D.F.R." - Flo Rida featuring Sage the Gemini and Lookas (Krump; Choreographer: Big Wave)
Top 12 Couple dances:

Solos:

Eliminated:
Ernestina Papazyan
Mikołaj Strzyż

Week 3: Top 10 (4 May 2015)

Group Dance: "Love Me Like You Do" - Ellie Goulding (Jazz; Choreographer: Diana Matos)
Guest Dancers:			
Aleksandra Liashenko & Maksim Woitiul - Polish National Ballet first soloists - Don Quixote adagio
Top 10 Couple dances:

Solos:

Eliminated:
Paulina Kubicka
Włodzimierz Kołobycz

Week 4: Top 8 (11 May 2015)
Group Dances:

Top 8 Couple dances:

Solos:

Eliminated:
Sara Janicka
Artur Golec

Week 5: Top 6 (18 May 2015)
Group Dance: "Flashlight" - Jessie J (Jazz; Choreographer: Kasia Kizior)
Guest Dancers:			
Ida Nowakowska (Season 1) - Beneath Your Beautiful - Labrinth & Emeli Sandé
Top 6 Couple dances:

Solos:

Eliminated:
Klaudia Sadło
Hubert Kozłowski

Week 6: Top 4 (25 May 2015)
Group Dance: "Come Get It Bae" - Pharrell Williams (Broadway; Choreographer: Blake McGrath)
Guest Dancers:			
Bboy (Nikola Lawenda, Julia Kuczkowska, Marysia Malepsi, Jan Lewandowski, Daniel Haciński, Hubert Kozłowski, Piotr Szwarc) - Feel Right - Mark Ronson & Mystikal

Solos:

Eliminated:
Klaudia Sadło
Michał Przybyła

Week 7: Top 2 (3 June 2015)
Guest Musical Guest: "Na zawsze" - Patricia Kazadi (with VOLT Group)
 Guest Dancers: 
 Fair Play Crew (with Rafał Kamiński from season 1 and Karol Niecikowski from season 3)
Group dances:

Top 2 Couple dances:

Top 2 solos:

Results:
Winner: Mateusz Sobecko
Runner Up: Natalia Gap

All-stars
During top 6 dancers from previous season danced with the participants as the part of the competition.

Ratings

References

2015 Polish television seasons
Season 08